Sportovní klub Slavia Praha B, commonly known as Slavia Prague B, is the reserve team of Czech First League club SK Slavia Prague. The team currently play in the Czech National Football League.

History
Formed shortly after Slavia Prague's footballing department, Slavia Prague B entered the Mistrovství Čech a Moravy in the springtime of 1897, finishing second behind the first team. Slavia's B team competed in the tournament until 1909. In 1949, the team entered the Oblastní soutěž, the second tier of Czechoslovak football, winning the title in 1958. During the 1960s, Slavia Prague B competed in the Second League, the Prague Championship and Divize B and Divize C, competing in the latter two competitions during the 1970s, before withdrawing from football from 1977 to 1984. During the 1980s, the team bounced between the third and the fourth tiers of Czech football, before the formation of the Bohemian Football League.

Following the dissolution of Czechoslovakia in 1993, Slavia Prague B remained in the Bohemian Football League, winning the competition in 1997. In 2011, Slavia Prague B finished 17th in the Bohemian Football League, being relegated into Divize A. From 2012 to 2019, the team competed in youth football, before returning to the Bohemian Football League in 2019. In 2022, Slavia Prague B were promoted in the Czech National Football League, the second tier of Czech football, after winning the Bohemian Football League.

Stadium
Since 2013, Slavia Prague B, alongside the club's youth teams from under-16 to under-19 level, has played at Na Chvalech in the Horní Počernice area of Prague, groundsharing with SC Xaverov.

Current squad

References

External links

SK Slavia Prague
Reserve team football
Youth football in the Czech Republic